The Office of Ratepayer Advocates (ORA) is the independent consumer advocate within the California Public Utilities Commission (CPUC), which regulates investor-owned public utilities in the state of California. ORA has a statutory mandate to represent the interests of these utility customers within the jurisdiction of the CPUC to obtain the lowest possible rate for service consistent with reliable and safe service levels. In fulfilling its mission, ORA also advocates for customer and environmental protections.

History 
Prior to the creation of ORA, CPUC staff often functioned as both advocates in formal regulatory proceedings as well as in an advisory role to the Commission known as the "Public Staff Division". Over time, this dual role of staff as both advocates and advisors came under criticism from both utilities and consumer organizations.

In 1984, the California Legislature renamed the Public Staff Division into Division of Ratepayer Advocates in a reorganization plan to improve efficiency of staff and resources. The change was codified in Public Utilities Code Section 309.5.

In 1996, SB 960 renamed the Division into the "Office of Ratepayer Advocates" (ORA). The change also implemented a measure of independence with respect to policy, advocacy, and budget, while recognizing the importance of keeping ORA housed within the CPUC to preserve the efficacy of mutual operations. SB 960 also made the DRA Director a gubernatorial appointee subject to Senate confirmation.

In 1997, the CPUC implemented "Vision 2000", a reorganization plan which significantly decreased ORA staff size but maintained the same responsibilities and workload.

In 2005, SB 608 renamed ORA as DRA and strengthened the division by providing it with autonomy over its budget and staffing resources and by authorizing the appointment of a full-time Chief Counsel.

In 2013, Governor Jerry Brown signed SB 96 which changed the name from the Division of Ratepayer Advocates back to the Office of Ratepayer Advocates.

Role 
Unlike other consumer advocates who intervene in CPUC proceedings, ORA has a mandate by law to represent the interests of ratepayers in virtually all CPUC proceedings. Often ORA is the only intervenor representing customers in these proceedings.

ORA staff performs in-depth review of utilities general rate cases as well as on numerous policy issues. ORA represents customers before other related agencies including the California Energy Commission, Air Resources Board, California Independent Services Operator, and the California Water Resources Board.

In 2015, ORA participated in 192 CPUC proceedings and filed approximately 605 pleadings to assist the CPUC in developing the record from which commissioners formulate their final decisions.

ORA is a member of the National Association of State Utility Consumer Advocates (NASUCA), which includes 44 utility consumer advocates in 40 states designated by law to represent the interests of consumers in their jurisdictions before state and federal regulators.

Energy 

ORA represents the ratepayers of California's investor-owned energy utilities or approximately 80% of all California's energy customers.

ORA represents the residential and small business customers of California's investor-owned energy utilities, most notably Pacific Gas and Electric Company (PG&E), Southern California Edison Company (Edison), San Diego Gas & Electric Company (SDG&E), and Southern California Gas Company (SoCalGas). ORA also represents the customers of California's smaller investor-owned utilities which include Bear Valley Electric Service, Edison Santa Catalina Island Propane Services, Liberty Utilities, PacificCorp, Southwest Gas, and West Coast Gas.

ORA reviews revenue increase requests of the investor-owned utilities through general rate cases and other proceedings, which in 2015 totalled more than $96 billion statewide. ORA supports the state's ambitious goals to reduce greenhouse gas emissions through the implementation of such strategies as renewables, distributed generation, energy efficiency, and demand response. ORA represents the interests of consumers to keep California's energy system reliable at reasonable costs through the state's holistic long-term procurement planning process. ORA advocates for safety as a primary objective, in particular in the CPUC's current efforts to improve natural gas pipeline safety in the wake of the 2010 San Bruno, California natural gas pipeline explosion. ORA advocates on behalf of low-income Californian's to continue to have access to programs to promote energy affordability and to prevent disconnections of essential energy service. ORA's efforts on energy issues aided in saving ratepayers approximately $5.3 billion. ORA is in general favor of residential rate design.

Water 

ORA represents over 6 million customers of Class A state investor owned utilities with more than 10,000 service connections, approximately 20% of California's urban water usage customers. ORA scrutinizes water utility requests for additional revenues that will increase customer bills and intervenes to shape water policies to protect ratepayer interests while meeting the state's water conservation goals. ORA seeks to protect consumer interests within the 9 large investor owned utilities, which have 63 geographically separate ratemaking districts, each with their own system costs.

In 2015, ORA examined approximately $40 million in water utility requests to increase revenues across four general rate cases. ORA reviewed water utility costs and operations, financial records, and other documents to ensure reasonableness and consistency with the Governor's Executive Order mandating water consumption reductions in response to the drought.

ORA supports the deployment of water-energy partnership programs to further state goals for energy efficiency and water conservation. ORA submitted a petition to the CPUC to create a proceeding aimed at developing partnerships between water and energy utilities.

ORA has advocated for cost-effective water conservation and encouraged associated energy savings measures. ORA seeks water supply solutions to address long-term water supply needs while keeping rates affordable.

Communications 

ORA represents customers of both wireline and wireless carriers on communications policy issues with particular focus on affordability, consumer protection, and service quality. ORA also works to ensure that all customers have equal access to broadband services at reasonable costs. ORA advocates on customers behalf in providing emergency communications, payphones, special telephone equipment and services for the deaf and disabled, public/ educational/ government channels from video franchises, broadband connections for schools and libraries, subsidized basic services for low-income individuals and families, and a high level of service quality and consumer protection for all Californians.

ORA efforts focus on communications affordability, consumer protection, service quality, and the reliability of voice and broadband Internet services. In 2015, ORA evaluated several merger and acquisition requests to ensure they were in the public interest. ORA persuaded the CPUC to not only understand the potential consequences for the public in the Comcast-Time Warner Sale and Transfer but preserve the year-long litigation record when Comcast motioned to withdraw its application.

ORA also assisted in the development in the CPUC's new Rate Case Plan for small telephone companies, impacting millions of customers for telephone and broadband services. ORA supports and is currently working on providing evidence on the CPUC's recently initiated investigation to assess the state of the telecommunications technologies and markets including voice, broadband, wireless, and wholesale services.

Over the years, ORA has advocated and won additional protections for wireless telephone customers as the CPUC adopted rules in requiring phone companies to be responsible for the content of their bills, refund customers for unauthorized charges, and provide customers with the option to block third party charges to their phone bills.

The California High Cost Fund-A (CHCF-A) is a CPUC subsidy program established in 1987 based on the concept that basic telephone service should be affordable and ubiquitously accessible to all members of society. In order to optimally utilize ratepayer subsidies, ORA supports CHCF-A improvements that will result in program and rate case processing efficiencies.

Beginning 2016, ORA will be actively working to provide evidence and in-depth analysis to shape a robust record in the CPUC's investigation to assess the state of the telecommunications market in California.

Structure 
The current staffing level consists of 147 technical, policy, and financial analysts with professional backgrounds as engineers, auditors, and economists with expertise in regulatory issues related to the electricity, natural gas, telecommunications, and water industries in California.

Director 
SB 960 made the ORA director a gubernatorial appointee subject to Senate confirmation. The current director is Elizabeth Echols. Governor Jerry Brown announced the appointment on February 10, 2016. She was sworn in and commenced her position as head of the ORA on March 28, 2016.

Branches 
The branches that compose ORA are:
 Energy
 Electricity Planning and Policy (EPP)
 Electricity Pricing and Customer Programs (EPCP)
 Energy Cost of Service and Natural Gas (ECOS-NG)
 Energy Safety and Infrastructure (ESI) 
 Water
 Communications and Water Policy

Policy & Planning 
Office of Ratepayer Advocates also maintains a full-time presence in Sacramento to actively participate in legislative and budgetary processes of the state. ORA works directly with the Governor's office, Legislature, Department of Finance, Legislative Analyst's Office, and other related entities. ORA collaborates with Member offices and represents ratepayers voices in the state capital by taking positions on upcoming bills, testifying in informational and bill hearings, providing technical legislative and constituent assistance, participating in working groups, and presenting updates on CPUC and ORA actions.

References 

 ORA Annual Report 2011
 ORA Annual Report 2010
 ORA Annual Report 2007
 
 
 
 NASUCA website

External links 
 Office of Ratepayer Advocates Official Website
 California Public Utilities Commission Official Website
 National Association of State Utility Consumer Advocates

Public utilities of the United States